Algerian Futsal Championship is the premier futsal league in Algeria. The competition is run by the Futsal Department under the auspices of the Algerian Football Federation.

History
The first Algerian Futsal Championship started in 2017. The Ligue Nationale de Futsal which started to run the championship was created on 15 February 2017 with Djamel Zemmam first president of the Ligue.

In 2021, The Ligue changed the name to Département de Futsal (Futsal Department) with Hakim Medane president.

List of champions

Performance by club

See also
Algerian Futsal Cup

References

External links
Official website

 

Futsal competitions in Algeria
futsal
2017 establishments in Algeria
Algeria
Sports leagues established in 2017
Futsal